Orvin may refer to:

Places:
Orvin, municipality in the canton of Bern in Switzerland
Orvin Mountains, major group of mountain ranges in Queen Maud Land

Surname:
Anders K. Orvin (1889–1980), Norwegian geologist and explorer

Given name:
Orvin B. Fjare (1918–2011), U.S. Representative from Montana
Orvin Cabrera (1977–2010), Honduran footballer

Other:
Orvin – Champion Of Champions, 2003 musical play by British playwright Alan Ayckbourn, with music by Denis King